The 1997 Canoe Slalom World Cup was a series of five races in 4 canoeing and kayaking categories organized by the International Canoe Federation (ICF). It was the 10th edition. The series consisted of 4 regular world cup races and the world cup final.

Calendar

Final standings 

The winner of each world cup race in the men's K1 was awarded 30 points while in the other three categories the winner was awarded 25 points. The points scale reached down to 1 point for 20th place in the men's K1 (15th place in the other three categories). Only the best two results of each athlete from the first 4 world cups plus the result from the world cup final counted for the final world cup standings. Furthermore, an athlete or boat had to compete in the world cup final in order to be classified in the world cup rankings. If two or more athletes or boats were equal on points, the ranking was determined by their positions in the world cup final.

Results

World Cup Race 1 

The first world cup race of the season took place in Bourg-Saint-Maurice, France from 21 to 22 June.

World Cup Race 2 

The second world cup race of the season took place in Björbo, Sweden from 28 to 29 June.

World Cup Race 3 

The third world cup race of the season took place at the Čunovo Water Sports Centre, Slovakia from 4 to 6 July.

World Cup Race 4 

The fourth world cup race of the season took place at the Ocoee Whitewater Center, Tennessee from 27 to 28 July.

World Cup Final 

The final world cup race of the season took place at the Minden Wild Water Preserve, Ontario from 2 to 3 August.

References

External links 
 International Canoe Federation

Canoe Slalom World Cup
1997 in canoeing